is a collection of old Japanese books on Japanese literature and history assembled by Hanawa Hokiichi (塙保己一) with the support of the Bakufu.

It has several sections separated in genre's such as shinto the native Japanese religion or waka Japanese poetry a short list is below

Shinto documents

Emperor documents

Bunin (appointment documents)

Keifu (genealogy documents)

Den (legend documents)

Kanshoku (government posts documents)

Ritsuryo (codes and laws documents)

Kuji (public duties documents)

Shozoku (costume documents)

Bunpitsu (literature documents)

Shosoku (letter documents)

Waka (Japanese poems documents)

Renga (linked verse poetry documents)

Monogatari (tales documents)

Nikki (diaries documents)

Kiko (travels documents)

Kangen (Japanese court music documents)

Kemari (a game played in the heian period documents)

Taka (hawking documents)

Yuge (play/games of skill documents )

Onjiki (eating and drinking and cooking documents)

Kassen (war documents)

Buke (samurai documents)

Shakuji (Buddhist names documents )

Zatsu (miscellaneous documents)

The first series in 1819 has 25 subjects with 1273 works. A modern print edition was published in 19 volumes from 1894 to 1912.

A second series of another 2103 texts was created by his son Hanawa Tadatomi (塙忠宝) from 1821 under the title Zoku Gunsho Ruijū (続群書類従). Another series, the Zoku Zoku Gunsho Ruijū  (続々群書類従), was assembled in two parts, the first with 16 subjects in 1903–4 in 5 volumes, the second in 1906–9 with 304 sources in 16 volumes. Shin Gunsho Ruijū (:ja:新群書類従) was printed in 1906–08 in 10 volumes.

Another text collection begun by Hanawa Tadatomi is the Dai Nihon Shiryō

See also
Wagakukōdansho
Taishō Tripiṭaka
Genkō yōshi was born from this books' printing plate.

References
Gunsho-ruijū. Tokyo 1894 -, Keizai Zasshisha
Shinko Gunsho-ruijū (新校群書類従). Tokyo 1936 Naigai Shoseki, 2 volumes
Gunsho-ruijū seizoku Bunrui sōmoku (群書類従正続分類総目錄). Tokyo in 1959, 410 pages (Classified catalog of the main and Ergänzugssammlungen)
 Mozume Takami (eds.):Gunsho sakuin (群書索引). Tokyo 1928 Kobunko Kankokai (concordance), 3 volumes
Zoku-Gunsho-ruijū. Zoku-gunsho-ruijū Kanseikai (続群書類従完成会). Tokyo 1923–30, 72 volumes
Gunsho-kaidai (群書解題). Tokyo 1960–7, 22 vol in 30 volumes (summaries of the works in GR and Z-GR)
Gunsho kaidai sōmokuji (群書解題総目次). Tokyo 1967 (index to 1960 edition)

External links
国立国会図書館デジタル化資料 - 群書類従. 第1-2冊
近代デジタルライブラリー- 群書類従: 新校. 第一巻
The full texts of numerous volumes of Zoku-Gunsho-ruijū and Zoku Zoku--Gunsho-ruijū
八木書店発売　続群書類従完成会在庫一覧
JapanKnowledge Lib

Japanese encyclopedias
1819 non-fiction books
1821 non-fiction books
1894 non-fiction books
1903 non-fiction books
1906 non-fiction books
19th-century encyclopedias
20th-century encyclopedias
Edo-period history books